Dong Yinchu (September 20, 1915 – June 23, 2009) was a Chinese male politician, who served as the vice chairperson of the Chinese People's Political Consultative Conference.

References 

1915 births
2009 deaths
National Chiao Tung University (Shanghai) alumni
China Zhi Gong Party politicians
Members of the Standing Committee of the 7th National People's Congress
Vice Chairpersons of the National Committee of the Chinese People's Political Consultative Conference